Vaidotas Šilėnas (born 16 July 1985) is a Lithuanian international footballer who plays for a midfielder.

Played for FC Šiauliai and FK Žalgiris. With Žalgiris became champion of Lithiania.

Short time played in FK Sūduva. 

Was member of FK Trakai team 4 seasons. In January left FK Trakai. 

Currently plays for Kražantė B team in native town Kražantė B.

References

1985 births
Living people
Lithuanian footballers
Lithuania international footballers
Association football midfielders
A Lyga players
FK Žalgiris players
FK Sūduva Marijampolė players
FC Šiauliai players
FK Riteriai players